The Deputy Chief of the Naval Staff (DCNS) is a senior appointment in the Indian Navy. The DCNS is a PSO (Principal Staff Officer) at Naval Headquarters in New Delhi. The office is held by a Three Star Officer in the rank of Vice Admiral. The current DCNS is Vice Admiral Sanjay Mahindru who took over Vice Admiral Ravneet Singh on 1 April 2022.

History
At the time of independence of India on 15 August 1947, the Chief of Staff to the Commander-in-Chief, Royal Indian Navy was the de facto Second-in-command. The appointment was held by an officer of the rank of Commodore. In 1949, the Chief of Staff was also made Deputy Commander-in-Chief RIN. In 1955, the post was re-designated Deputy Chief of the Naval Staff. In 1959, the post was upgraded to Two-star rank. In 1967, this post was re-designated to Vice Chief of the Naval Staff and then Rear Admiral Sourendra Nath Kohli took over as the first VCNS.

From 1972
The appointment was brought back in 1972 in the rank of Rear Admiral. The branch was responsible for Operations, Intelligence, Signals, Air Staff, Air Materiel and Submarines. In 1984, the post was upgraded to three-star rank.

Current organisation
The DCNS heads the Staff Branch-II at the Naval Headquarters. The following Director General/Assistant Principal Staff Officers report into the DCNS.
 Director General Naval Operations (DGNO)
 Assistant Chief of Naval Staff (Communication, Space and Network Centric Operations) (reports through the DGNO)
 Assistant Chief of Naval Staff (Foreign Co-operation & Intelligence)
 Assistant Chief of Naval Staff (Air) 
 Assistant Chief of Naval Staff (Air Materiel)

Order of precedence
The DCNS ranks at No. 24 on the Indian order of precedence, along with Lieutenant Generals of the Indian Army and Air Marshals of the Indian Air Force. The DCNS is in the HAG+ pay scale (pay level 16), and draws salary depending on the years in service. However, since they should not draw equivalent or more than the next higher level, the renumeration is capped at ₹224,000.

Deputy Chiefs of Naval Staff

1947-1967

1973-present

See also
 Chief of the Naval Staff
 Vice Chief of the Naval Staff
 Deputy Chief of the Air Staff

Notes

References

Indian Navy appointments
Indian military appointments